Smith Mountain, is a prominent peak in the Taconic Mountains of western Massachusetts, USA. The mountain is located in Pittsfield State Forest and is traversed by the  multi-use Taconic Skyline Trail. The summit is known for its extensive stand of wild azalea and is wooded with northern hardwood tree species.

Most of Smith Mountain is located within Hancock with lower east slopes within Pittsfield. West Mountain, a spur of Smith Mountain, is located along the mountain's south ridgeline. The Taconic ridgeline continues north from Smith Mountain as Pine Mountain and Tower Mountain, and south as Doll Mountain. It is bordered by West Hill to the west across the Wyomanock Creek valley. The west side of the mountain drains into Wyomanock Creek, then into Kinderhook Creek, thence into the Hudson River and Long Island Sound. The east side drains into Smith Brook, thence to the Housatonic River and Long Island Sound.

References
 Massachusetts Trail Guide (2004). Boston: Appalachian Mountain Club.
 Commonwealth Connections proposal PDF download. Retrieved March 2, 2008.
 AMC Massachusetts and Rhode Island Trail Guide (1989). Boston: Appalachian Mountain Club.
 "Greenways and Trails" Massachusetts DCR. Retrieved February 22, 2008.

External links
 Pittsfield State Forest map
 Pittsfield State Forest. Massachusetts DCR.

Mountains of Berkshire County, Massachusetts
Taconic Mountains